Place de Barcelone (Barcelona square or Barcelona place) is a square in the center Tunis, capital of Tunisia.

Location 
The square is surrounded by the streets of Belgium (rue de Belgique) and Ali-Darghouth. The streets that converge towards the square are the streets of Holland (rue de Holland), Koufa, Greece (rue de Grèce), Ali-Darghouth, England (rue d'Angleterre), Spain (rue d'Espagne), as well as Avenue Farhat-Hached.
It is located not far from the embassies of France in Tunisia, Italy and Place Mongi-Bali.

Transport 
It is home to an important urban transport hub, with the Tunis light metro, many bus lines, the Gare de Tunis managed by the Tunisian National Railway Company and a public garden. 
In 2011, it is the place of several demonstrations.

In 2008, the central director of major projects of the Société des transports de Tunis (Transtu) announced that it would launch a redevelopment project with a total value of 27.3 million dinars. He must create an underground bus station, the whole of the place then being dedicated to the metro; an improvement in traffic in the neighboring streets and avenues is also expected.

Gallery

References

Streets in Tunis
Buildings and structures in Tunis